Kakrybashevo (Käkrebaş) is a rural locality (a selo) and the administrative centre of Kakrybashevsky Selsoviet, Tuymazinsky District, Bashkortostan, Russia. The population was 651 as of 2010. There are 10 streets.

Geography 
Kakrybashevo is located 13 km north of Tuymazy (the district's administrative centre) by road. Ismailovo is the nearest rural locality.

References 

Rural localities in Tuymazinsky District